The 1898 Massachusetts gubernatorial election was held on November 8, 1898. Incumbent Republican Governor Roger Wolcott was re-elected to a third term in office, defeating Democratic former Mayor of Lawrence Alexander B. Bruce.

General election

Results

See also
 1898 Massachusetts legislature

References

Governor
1898
Massachusetts
November 1898 events